This is a list of notable alumni of Loyola High School in Los Angeles.

Notable alumni and students

Athletics 

 Toby Bailey - former UCLA basketball player and 1995 NCAA champion, former NBA player
 Gordon Banks - former NFL and USFL wide receiver
 Anthony Barr - former UCLA All-American outside linebacker, drafted in the first round of the 2014 NFL Draft by the Minnesota Vikings, starting OLB in 2016 Pro Bowl
Myles Bryant - defensive back for the New England Patriots, former All-Pac-12 football player at the University of Washington
 Chris Conte - safety for the Tampa Bay Buccaneers, formerly at Cal and Chicago Bears
Garrett Cooper - first baseman for the Miami Marlins
 Danny Farmer - former UCLA football player and university record holder for most yards receiving, former NFL player
 Jeff Grau - former NFL tight end/long snapper for the Dallas Cowboys and Miami Dolphins.
 Tim Layana - late Major League Baseball pitcher and World Series Champion (1990)
 Ryan Lefebvre - baseball announcer for the Kansas City Royals
 David Long - cornerback for the Los Angeles Rams, former All-Big Ten football player at the University of Michigan. 
 Jim McAnany - right fielder for Chicago White Sox in 1959 World Series vs. Los Angeles Dodgers
George Paton - general manager of the Denver Broncos and former UCLA football player 
 Al Pollard - All-American at Army and running back for the Philadelphia Eagles
Coleman Shelton - offensive lineman for the Los Angeles Rams, former All-Pac-12 football player at the University of Washington 
 Sinjin Smith - pioneer world pro volleyball champion
 Tom Satriano - former Major League Baseball player
 Fred Snodgrass - outfielder for the New York Giants and appeared in the 1912 World Series; later Mayor of Oxnard, California 
 Hollis Thompson - former Georgetown basketball player, Philadelphia 76ers shooting guard
 David Torrence - pro runner and American record holder in 1000 meter
 Matt Ware - former UCLA quarterback and safety with the Philadelphia Eagles, Arizona Cardinals and Toronto Argonauts
 Thomas Weber - former Arizona State football player and 2007 Lou Groza Award winner as the NCAA's top placekicker
 Thomas Welsh - Charlotte Hornets player, former UCLA basketball player, McDonald's All-American

Business and economics 

 Thomas J. Barrack Jr. - CEO of Colony Capital
 James Barrett - founder of Chateau Montelena 
 Jerry Grundhofer - former CEO and Chairman of U.S. Bancorp
 John F. Grundhofer - retired Chairman and CEO, U.S. Bancorp
 Enrique Hernandez Jr. - CEO of Inter-Con Security Systems, Inc., and non-executive chairman of McDonald's
William J. McMorrow - Chairman and CEO, Kennedy Wilson
 Edward P. Roski - founder of Majestic Realty Co., billionaire, 163rd richest American (2008)
 Wilfred Von der Ahe - founder of Von's grocery stores
Gregory Q. Breen - Hermosa Beach Mayor

Arts & entertainment 

 Andy Ackerman - multiple Emmy-winning director of Cheers, Seinfeld, WKRP in Cincinnati, Wings, The New Adventures of Old Christine 
 Aron - singer and member of the boy band NU'EST
 Bob Beemer - multiple Academy Award-winning sound mixer
 Roddy Bottum - founder member of, and keyboardist in, alternative rock bands Faith No More and Imperial Teen
 James Brown - painter known for rough semi-figurative paintings
 Clifton Collins Jr. - actor in Latino entertainment industry
 John Debney - Emmy-winning music composer for Disney and The Passion of the Christ
 Bill Gould - founder member of, and bassist in, alternative rock band Faith No More; music producer, sound engineer and record label proprietor
 Chris Hardwick - CEO of Nerdist Industries, comedian, actor, television host of @midnight with Chris Hardwick
 Michael Keenan - actor (Picket Fences), stage director, and professor of acting at the University of Southern California
 Dan McCleary - artist; founder of Art Division, a nonprofit offering arts training, academic and career support to young adults in the MacArthur Park community in Los Angeles
 Dennis McNeil - singer
 Peter Miles - actor
 Patrick Muldoon - actor in film Starship Troopers and television show Days of Our Lives
 Paul Nassif - plastic surgeon, star of Real Housewives of Beverly Hills, Botched, and Botched by Nature
 Daniel Olivas - award-winning author and attorney
 Tony Plana - actor in films and on television show Ugly Betty
 Cameron Rodriguez, rapper
 William Schallert - veteran character actor in many films and television shows including Perry Mason, Star Trek, The Waltons, Hawaii Five-O, Quincy, M.E., The Partridge Family and Bonanza
 Jeff von der Schmidt - Grammy Award-winning conductor, founding Artistic Director of Southwest Chamber Music and the LA International New Music Festival
 Michael Wayne - film producer, son of Hollywood legend and founder of the John Wayne Cancer Institute
 Patrick Wayne - veteran motion picture and television actor began career in Rio Grande with his father John Wayne

Government, activism and politics 

 Gene Baur - Farm Sanctuary President and co-founder
 Eugene Biscailuz - former Los Angeles County Sheriff and organizer of the California Highway Patrol
 John M. Costello - member of US Congress and Democratic Party candidate for US President
 Isidore Dockweiler - served on the US Board of Indian Commissioners and Los Angeles City Library Commission; nominated John Costello as US Presidential candidate
 John Dockweiler - former Los Angeles District Attorney 
 Bob Dornan - "B-1 Bob"; vocal US congressman from the South Bay for many years
 Mike Gatto - California State Assemblyman
 Mike Levin - Congressman from California's 49th congressional district
 Nick Pacheco - Councilmember, City of Los Angeles (1999-2003); ASUC Executive Vice-President, UC Berkeley (1984-1985); Co-founder, CAL Students for Equal Rights & a Valid Education (CalSERVE), UC Berkeley (1984)
 Steve Pavlina - personal development blogger, motivational speaker, author
 Gerardo Sandoval - former member of the San Francisco Board of Supervisors and current judge of the San Francisco County Superior Court
 Alexander-Martin Sardina - German former member of parliament, attended the LHS in 1990 as an exchange student
 Bob Shrum - Senior Advisor to John Kerry's 2004 presidential campaign
 Anthony A. Williams - Mayor of Washington, D.C., 1999–2007

Journalism and media 

 Stan Chambers - longtime reporter with KTLA 5, Los Angeles
 Josh Elliot - television journalist
 George Herriman - pioneering cartoonist and creator of the "Krazy Kat" strip for the Los Angeles Herald Examiner
 Ryan Jacobs - Deputy Editor of Pacific Standard magazine; writer for magazines including The Atlantic and Mother Jones; author of The Truffle Underground
 Geoff Miller - founder of Los Angeles Magazine
 Daniel Olivas - award-winning author, book critic, and attorney
 Lawrence Ross, Jr. - Los Angeles Times best selling author, college lecturer
 S. S. Van Dine - born Willard Huntington Wright; pioneer Los Angeles "noir" detective writer
 Charles Glass - author and former ABC News Chief Mideast Correspondent

Law 

 Paul Boland - associate justice of the California Court of Appeal
 William Byrne - judge of the United States District Court for the Central District of California, presided over the trial of Pentagon Papers defendant Daniel Ellsberg
 Thomas Girardi - lawyer in the Erin Brockovich case; wife Erika Jayne appears on The Real Housewives of Beverly Hills
 Michael Tynan - judge of the Los Angeles County Superior Court

Educators and religious 

 Gordon Bennett - former Principal and President of Loyola High School and former Catholic bishop in Baltimore and Jamaica
 Greg Boyle - founder of Homeboy Industries
Robert J. Henle - President of Georgetown University
 Joseph Sarsfield Glass C.M. - 10th President of St. Vincent's College 
 Mark R. Nemec (1987) - 9th President of Fairfield University
 Stephen Privett - President - Verbum Dei High School, Los Angeles, CA
 Thomas J. Reese - writer, editor and commentator on church affairs; President Obama appointed him to the United States Commission on International Religious Freedom
 Jonathan Veitch - 15th President of Occidental College

References

Loyola High School, Los Angeles
Loyola High School, Los Angeles
Loyola High School
Loyola High School, Los Angeles